This is a family tree of Sun Yat-sen, the first provisional president of the Republic of China.  The following chart uses Mandarin pinyin romanization. Some members may have been referred to in the Cantonese, Hakka, Hokkien at one time or another.  Pre-marriage surnames are used.

Sun Yat-sen Chinese family tree

Sun Yat-sen Japanese family tree

See also
 Four big families of the Republic of China

References

 Singtao daily. Feb 28, 2011. 特別策劃  section A10. Sun Yat-sen Xinhai revolution 100th anniversary edition. Full family tree starting with Sun Yat-sen.
 
 
 張耀杰. [2010] (2010). 懸案百年——宋教仁案與國民黨. 秀威資訊科技股份有限公司. , .

Political families of China
Sun Yat-sen family